

Eli Upfal is a computer science researcher, currently the Rush C. Hawkins Professor of Computer Science at Brown University. He completed his undergraduate studies in mathematics and statistics at the Hebrew University, Israel in 1978, received an M.Sc. in computer science from the Feinberg Graduate School of the Weizmann Institute of Science, Israel in 1980, and completed his PhD in computer science at the Hebrew University in 1983 under Eli Shamir. He has made contributions in a variety of areas.  Most of his work involves randomized and/or online algorithms, stochastic processes, or the probabilistic analysis of deterministic algorithms.  Particular applications include routing and communications networks, computational biology, and computational finance.

He is responsible for a large body of work, including, as of May 2012, more than 150 publications in journals and conferences as well as many patents.  He has won several prizes, including the IBM Outstanding Innovation Award and the Levinson Prize in Mathematical Sciences. In 2002, Eli Upfal, was inducted as a Fellow of the Institute of Electrical and Electronics Engineers, and in 2005 he was inducted as a Fellow of the Association for Computing Machinery.  He received, together with Yossi Azar, Andrei Broder, Anna Karlin, and Michael Mitzenmacher, the 2020 ACM Paris Kanellakis Award.

Eli is a coauthor of the book

References

External links 
 Eli Upfal's website

Living people
Theoretical computer scientists
Fellows of the Association for Computing Machinery
Fellow Members of the IEEE
Israeli computer scientists
Brown University faculty
Year of birth missing (living people)